"Carry Me On" is a 2013 song by Brookes Brothers.

Carry Me On may also refer to:

"Carry Me On", a song by Arc Angels, from the 1992 album Arc Angels